Paul Meldrum (born 13 September 1960) is a former Australian rules footballer who played for Carlton in the Victorian Football League (VFL) during the 1980s.

Meldrum was a versatile footballer could play anywhere on the ground, and made his debut for Carlton in 1982. He played 158 games for the club, including playing in their winning 1987 VFL Grand Final team. In the same year Meldrum finished equal 3rd in the Brownlow Medal count and represented Victoria in interstate football.

External links

1960 births
Living people
Australian rules footballers from Victoria (Australia)
Carlton Football Club players
Carlton Football Club Premiership players
One-time VFL/AFL Premiership players